MaryAnne Geivett Tebedo (born October 30, 1936 in Denver, Colorado) was a Colorado State Senator from Colorado Springs.

From 1982 through 1988 Tebedo served as a Republican in the Colorado House of Representatives, and was elected to the Colorado State Senate in 1988. Tebedo completed her legislative career on December 31, 2001 pursuant to term limits. Tebedo chaired two Senate committees, the Local Government Committee and the State, Military and Veterans Affairs Committee, and served on eight legislative committees. Legislation she sponsored dealt with early education through college, transportation, energy and mining, local government affairs, National Guard, state finance, constitution and elections, large and small business and labor affairs, and the environment.

Colorado Springs Gazette columnist Ralph Routon wrote a series of columns supporting the idea of placing all of Colorado on year-round daylight saving time in order to save state residents the "aggravation of resetting their clocks every six months."  The idea gathered noticeable popular support within Colorado Springs, and attention of the state's larger newspapers, but when then state Senator MaryAnne Tebedo attempted to present the idea to the state legislature, her research uncovered Federal laws forbidding the state-initiated extension of daylight saving time.  Still determined to relieve Coloradans of the need to change their clocks, Tebedo introduced the only bill legally permitted to her: a proposal to exempt the state of Colorado from DST.  The bill failed to escape committee during the 2000 legislative session.

MaryAnne is the mother of Kevin Tebedo, a former Executive Director of the organization Colorado for Family Values.

References
 Links inactive  for 1. 2.  3.

External links

https://web.archive.org/web/20061106224409/http://www.maryannetebedo.com/personal.htm
https://web.archive.org/web/20110208065215/http://maryannetebedo.com/

1936 births
Politicians from Colorado Springs, Colorado
Living people
Republican Party Colorado state senators
Republican Party members of the Colorado House of Representatives
Women state legislators in Colorado